Scam City is a television show which started airing on Travel + Escape in June 2012, and has subsequently aired on the National Geographic Channel, and in Australia on the subscription channel Nat Geo People. Host Conor Woodman travels to some of the world's most popular cities in an effort to expose the darker side of tourism.

Premise
Woodman meets with questionable characters ranging from unethical cab drivers to aggressive pimps as he witnesses and experiences the travel experience of parting with personal property and money. He intentionally falls victim to these alleged scammers and says "yes" to every sex worker and pocket jeweler in the city. The show aims to expose the local adaptations of common scams – from pick pockets, expensive cab fares, to bars luring people in with adult entertainment at a high cost.

Awards

Scam City was nominated for Best Popular Factual Series at the UK Broadcast Digital Awards in 2014  and in 2015 for Best Factual Series at the Canadian Screen Awards.

Controversy

Istanbul

After the transmission of Scam City in Istanbul, the city's authorities responded by making several arrests. As a result of the programme several 'clip joints' in the city were shut down and so-called 'false friends' who were operating in them were arrested, although the practice is still commonplace today.

In the Istanbul episode further scams are exposed at the Blue Mosque where touts trick tourists into paying for unofficial tours and then coerce them into buying goods such as carpets that they do not want. As a result of the program, Turkish authorities moved to change the laws to prevent tourists being targeted in this way.

Prague

According to Prague's police department, all events depicted in the Prague episode were staged and the scammers were actually hired actors, as Czech Prima TV first revealed in October 2013. The Prague Police spokesperson, Ms. Jana Rösslerová, happened to see the episode on TV and immediately informed her colleagues. The Prague Police started to investigate the crimes depicted in the episode. They found and interrogated people featured in the documentary and checked all places where the crimes should have taken place. The result of their work was discovery that the whole reportage was fiction and staff shooting the documentary hired actors and extras for the roles of scammers. According to the police, the nightclub depicted as a haunt of prostitutes and blackmailers had been closed for several years, and the company Eurotaxi, used as an example of taxi overpricing in Prague, had gone bankrupt in 2011, a year before the show was created.

Czech news agency Stream.cz repeated many of the investigations from the Scam City documentary. Their crew got into similar situations and were sometimes scammed with even worse results. They argued for the integrity of the Scam City programme and also revealed some errors in the statements made by Prague officials. For example, they claimed the notorious bar with prostitutes was not closed in 2011 as the police claimed, but in fact was still open at the time the original documentary was made.

On 29 July 2014, City of Prague announced that they had reached an out-of-court agreement with National Geographic. National Geographic will not broadcast nor offer this episode of Scam City, but no apology is required. The decision to settle out of court was taken since a lawsuit would be long, expensive, and of uncertain outcome.

Conor Woodman was requested by local police to give an explanation, but refused, stating that interviews with criminals had been secured on the basis that information would not be shared with the police. Interpol was requested for assistance in this matter but declined.

National Geographic Channel insists that the documentary is not a fake, and that all persons depicted in the documentary were informed after the filming.

Amsterdam

An episode aired in January 2014 provoked similar controversy, this time involving the city of Amsterdam. In the episode, various supposed crimes were filmed, including those committed by criminals posing as police officers, and Conor Woodman tweeted, in July 2013, "Amsterdam is right up there for the title of Scammiest City. It has all the right ingredients and all the right chefs!" A police investigation revealed, according to Amsterdam mayor Eberhard van der Laan, that the filmmakers had paid criminals to appear in the videos. National Geographic confirmed that people had been paid, but that they hadn't been actors; pending investigation they pulled the show from their rotation. Van der Laan referred to the show as "scam television", demanding an apology and rectification, and pending that threatened to take the matter to court. Woodman responded in a tweet, "O come on Mr Mayor! Convicted criminals we caught on camera in the Amsterdam ep[isode] say they were only 'acting'. You believe that?!! #whatever".

In March 2014, Amsterdam TV channel AT5 published a story alleging that one of the people who had appeared in the Amsterdam episode claimed to have been paid 1,800 Euro by National Geographic, and that representatives from National Geographic were discussing the matter with the city.

On May 23, 2014, the city of Amsterdam announced that an agreement had been reached with National Geographic; National Geographic acknowledged that many of the events depicted in the show had been staged, though they said no actors were ever used and the program was based on extensive research.

Season 1 (2012)

Season 2 (2014)

Further reading
Sharks: Investigating the Criminal Heart of the Global City is Conor Woodman's book based on his research for Scam City and other shows (September Publishing, 2017).

References

External links

2012 Canadian television series debuts
2010s Canadian reality television series
Confidence tricks
Deception